Frederick Avey (31 August 1909 – 17 September 1999) was an English professional footballer who played as a forward in the late 1920s and early 1930s. He was born in Poplar, London.

References

1909 births
1999 deaths
Footballers from Poplar, London
English footballers
Association football forwards
Leytonstone F.C. players
Leyton F.C. players
Fulham F.C. players
Torquay United F.C. players
Tunbridge Wells F.C. players
English Football League players